Hasmig Belleli is a politician in Montreal, Quebec, Canada. She served on the Montreal city council from 1994 to 2005 and again from 2008 to 2009 as a member of Vision Montreal.

Early life
Belleli was born Hasmig Vasilian in Lebanon, to a family of Armenian background. She moved to Canada with her husband in 1967. During her time on council, she fought for a memorial to the Armenian genocide to be constructed in Montreal.

City councillor
1994–2005
Belleli was first elected to city council in the 1994 municipal election in the Ahuntsic ward. Vision Montreal won a council majority in this election, and Belleli served as a backbench supporter of Pierre Bourque's administration. She supported the mayor during the Vision Montreal internal party crisis of 1997, and in February 1997 she was appointed as chair of the city's urban planning commission and to the Montreal Urban Community's administration and finance committee.

Belleli was re-elected in the 1998 municipal election, in which Vision Montreal won a second consecutive council majority. She continued serving as chair of the urban planning commission following the election. In March 1999, her committee approved a controversial housing project in one of the city's largest remaining greenspaces, at the foot of Mount Royal. The committee later approved initiatives to construct condominiums on the Redpath Refinery, transform the Rialto Theatre into a dance club, and launch a Loblaws store in Ahuntsic. (Belleli abstained from voting on the last two decisions and voted against the Loblaws plan when it came before council.)

In 2001, Belleli's committee voted to support demolition of the dormant York Theatre in order to permit an expansion of Concordia University. She defended this decision against the complaints of heritage groups, saying, "It seems to me that in no case do these groups make a gesture (like) a financing campaign each year to collect money to buy these buildings and conserve them. It's easy to say conserve, conserve, conserve."

Belleli supported Mayor Bourque's successful campaign to create a single municipal administration for the Island of Montreal. She was elected to a third council term for the Acadie division in 2001, as Gérald Tremblay's Montreal Island Citizens Union (MICU) defeated Vision Montreal across the city. She served in opposition for the next four years and was defeated in her bid for re-election in 2005.
2008–2009
Belleli returned to city council after winning a by-election for the Ahuntsic division in 2008. Tremblay's party (renamed as Union Montreal) still held a majority on council, and Belleli again served as an opposition member. She sought re-election for the neighbouring Bordeaux-Cartierville division in 2009 but was defeated by Harout Chitilian of Union Montreal.

By virtue of holding her seat on city council, Belleli was also a member of the Ahuntsic-Cartierville borough council from 2001 to 2005 and again from 2008 to 2009.

Federal politics
Belleli was nominated as the Liberal Party of Canada's candidate for Alfred-Pellan prior to the 2008 federal election. She withdrew from the contest after being re-elected to city council.

Electoral record

References

Living people
Montreal city councillors
Women in Quebec politics
Women municipal councillors in Canada
Canadian people of Armenian descent
Year of birth missing (living people)